The term Suárez government may refer to:

Suárez I Government, the government of Spain under Adolfo Suárez from 1976 to 1977.
Suárez II Government, the government of Spain under Adolfo Suárez from 1977 to 1979.
Suárez III Government, the government of Spain under Adolfo Suárez from 1979 to 1981.